Canterbury Girls Secondary College is an all-girls secondary school located in Canterbury, Victoria, Australia. The  school  provides an  education from years 7 to 12.

History
It was established in 1928 as  East Camberwell Domestic Arts School, catering for  girls  and  offering courses up to Year 10. It  became  Camberwell  Girls'  High  School in 1958, having, throughout the 1950s, had  a  number of  official names. In 1961 the name Canterbury Girls' High School was adopted. In 1989, after consultation with the school community, the school's name was changed in line with Government policy to Canterbury Girls' Secondary College.  It remains a girls state school.

Canterbury Girls' Secondary College was ranked 17th out of all state secondary schools in Victoria based on VCE results in 2018.

Notable alumni

 Rosé (real name Roseanne Park)member of South Korean  girl group Blackpink
 Suzanne Cory molecular biologist
 Esther Hannafordactress
 Kate Kendallactress
 Steph StringsllGuitarist
 Susanne NewtonCity of Darebin Councillor (2016 to current) and former Deputy Mayor (2018 to 2020)
 Catherine Durkin Reporter and Presenter for Fox Sports

References

External links

Public high schools in Melbourne
Educational institutions established in 1928
Girls' schools in Victoria (Australia)
Alliance of Girls' Schools Australasia
1928 establishments in Australia
Buildings and structures in the City of Boroondara